Pacheco is a census-designated place (CDP) in Contra Costa County, California. The population was 3,685 at the 2010 census. It is bounded by Martinez to the north and west, Concord to the east, and Pleasant Hill to the south.

History

The town was laid out in 1857 by Dr. J. H. Carothers and named for Salvio Pacheco, grantee of the Rancho Monte del Diablo Mexican land grant. A post office operated at Pacheco from 1859 to 1913 and from 1955 to the present.

Pacheco was briefly a prosperous commercial center. During this period, Pacheco Slough was deep enough to receive ocean-based shipping.  From 1851 to nearly 1873, Pacheco was the county’s commercial center: the shipping port for the grain grown in the Ygnacio, San Ramon and Tassajara valleys, with warehouses, a flour mill and shops along the creek. Walnut Creek, (then known as Pacheco Creek), then flowed deep and free into Suisun Bay. For over 20 years, Pacheco was a major shipping port for central Contra Costa County.

The destruction of Pacheco’s Walnut Creek shipping channel occurred gradually over many years and for many reasons.  Man-made ecologic damage eventually combined with a series of fires and floods, as well as an earthquake, destroyed the town and filled the Slough with silt during the 1860s, to ruin Pacheco's growing prosperity just as similar ones had done to the great classic ports of Ephesus and Troy. Pacheco was subsequently depopulated by the attraction of the nearby town of Todos Santos, later to be known as Concord.

Annexation 
In January 2011 the Martinez City Council voted to annex those portions of Pacheco north of California State Route 4. In September 2011, Martinez reached a tax sharing deal to pave the way forward for the annexation. In March 2012, sufficient protests were registered to force an election on the issue. In August 2012, the Martinez Police were mobilized to convince the voters to agree to the proposal.

As part of the annexation, Martinez would take over the management of the new Pacheco transit hub.

In August 2012 North Pacheco rejected annexation. Residents and property owners voted 40-39 against becoming part of Martinez. The 111-acre area remains unincorporated, governed by the County Board of Supervisors.

Opponents of the annexation called it a "bad deal for all" on a website created to oppose the proposal. The site claimed that annexing Pacheco would be too costly for Martineza city already suffering a deficit, and that property taxes would go up for residents and businesses. The Contra Costa Times reported that annexation of an area along Interstate 680 from Highway 4 north to the Burlington-Northern Santa Fe railroad crossing was approved by the Contra Costa County Local Area Formation Commission earlier that year. LAFCO's Executive Officer Lou Ann Texeira said that commissioners would have to take action to terminate the annexation at the September 12 meeting. City leaders say that the North Pacheco gateway area offers the potential for profit-making development. The Martinez city council scheduled another vote on the issue, possibly with a larger area.

Geography 

Climate 

This region experiences warm (but not hot) and dry summers, with no average monthly temperatures above 71.6 °F.  According to the Köppen Climate Classification system, Pacheco has a warm-summer Mediterranean climate, abbreviated "Csb" on climate maps.

Demographics

2010
The 2010 United States Census reported that Pacheco had a population of 3,685. The racial makeup of Pacheco was 2,814 (76.4%) White, 78 (2.1%) African American, 27 (0.7%) Native American, 366 (9.9%) Asian, 11 (0.3%) Pacific Islander, 201 (5.5%) from other races, and 188 (5.1%) from two or more races. Hispanic or Latino of any race were 619 persons (16.8%).

The Census reported that 3,662 people (99.4% of the population) lived in households, 23 (0.6%) lived in non-institutionalized group quarters, and 0 (0%) were institutionalized.

There were 1,558 households, out of which 403 (25.9%) had children under the age of 18 living in them, 607 (39.0%) were opposite-sex married couples living together, 247 (15.9%) had a female householder with no husband present, 84 (5.4%) had a male householder with no wife present.  There were 94 (6.0%) unmarried opposite-sex partnerships, and 19 (1.2%) same-sex married couples or partnerships. 498 households (32.0%) were made up of individuals, and 206 (13.2%) had someone living alone who was 65 years of age or older. The average household size was 2.35.  There were 938 families (60.2% of all households); the average family size was 2.97.

The population was spread out, with 706 people (19.2%) under the age of 18, 264 people (7.2%) aged 18 to 24, 898 people (24.4%) aged 25 to 44, 1,231 people (33.4%) aged 45 to 64, and 586 people (15.9%) who were 65 years of age or older.  The median age was 44.4 years. For every 100 females, there were 92.5 males.  For every 100 females age 18 and over, there were 87.9 males.

The homeowner vacancy rate was 1.5%; the rental vacancy rate was 12.6%.  2,919 people (79.2% of the population) lived in owner-occupied housing units and 743 people (20.2%) lived in rental housing units.

2000
As of the census of 2000, there were 3,562 people, 1,563 households, and 923 families residing in the CDP. The racial makeup of the CDP was 82.85% White, 2.22% Black or African American, 0.79% Native American, 7.41% Asian, 0.22% Pacific Islander, 2.95% from other races, and 3.57% from two or more races.  11.82% of the population were Hispanic or Latino of any race.

There were 1,563 households, out of which 23.6% had children under the age of 18 living with them, 40.1% were married couples living together, 13.8% had a female householder with no husband present, and 40.9% were non-families. 32.8% of all households were made up of individuals, and 13.4% had someone living alone who was 65 years of age or older.  The average household size was 2.28 and the average family size was 2.87.

In the CDP, the population was spread out, with 20.5% under the age of 18, 6.5% from 18 to 24, 30.2% from 25 to 44, 26.7% from 45 to 64, and 16.1% who were 65 years of age or older.  The median age was 40 years. For every 100 females, there were 92.1 males.  For every 100 females age 18 and over, there were 85.0 males.

Males had a median income of $48,466 versus $33,359 for females. The per capita income for the CDP was $26,064. About 7.9% of families and 10.2% of the population were below the poverty line, including 11.0% of those under age 18 and 7.7% of those age 65 or over.

Education
It is in the Mount Diablo Unified School District.

Media
The town of Pacheco is served by the daily newspaper, Contra Costa Times published by Bay Area News Group-East Bay (part of the Media News Group, Denver, Colorado).  The paper was originally run and owned by the Lesher family. Claycord.com is the independent news and talk blog serving the greater Pacheco area.

See also

 List of census-designated places in California

References

External links

1857 establishments in California
Census-designated places in California
Census-designated places in Contra Costa County, California
Pony Express stations
Populated places established in 1857